Battle of the Five Armies may refer to:

 Battle of the Five Armies, the fictional climactic battle in the novel The Hobbit
 Battle of the Five Armies (board game), a 1975 game that simulates the battle
 The Hobbit: The Battle of the Five Armies, a 2014 film based on the novel